Sanaye Giti Pasand Futsal Club is part of Giti Pasand Sports Club in Iran. It is based in Isfahan.

Season to season

The table below chronicles the achievements of the Club in various competitions.

Last updated: December 29, 2021

1 Persepolis and Giti Pasand were penalized 6 points in the 2011–12 season by the Iranian Football Federation.
Notes:
* unofficial titles
1 worst title in history of club

Key

P   = Played
W   = Games won
D   = Games drawn
L   = Games lost

GF  = Goals for
GA  = Goals against
Pts = Points
Pos = Final position

Honours

Domestic 
 Iranian Futsal Super League
 Winners (3): 2012–13, 2016–17, 2021–22
  Runners-up (7): 2010–11, 2011–12, 2013–14, 2014–15, 2018–19, 2019–20, 2020–21

Continental 
 AFC Futsal Club Championship
 Winners (1): 2012
  Runners-up (2): 2013, 2017

Individual 
 Best player
 Futsal goalkeeper of the world in 2010  – Mostafa Nazari
 Asian Futsaler of the Year 2011 – Mohammad Keshavarz
 Best futsal player of the 2016–17 Iranian Futsal Super League – Ali Asghar Hassanzadeh
 Best goalkeeper  of the 2015–16 Iranian Futsal Super League – Sepehr Mohammadi
 Best goalkeeper  of the 2016–17 Iranian Futsal Super League – Sepehr Mohammadi
 AFC Futsal Club Championship MVP Award:
   2012 - Mohammad Keshavarz
   2017 - Ali Asghar Hassanzadeh
 Iran World Cup captains:
  2012 – Mohammad Keshavarz
 Top Goalscorer
 Iranian Futsal Super League:
 2010–11 Iranian Futsal Super League
  Masoud Daneshvar (24 goals)
 2012–13 Iranian Futsal Super League
  Ahmad Esmaeilpour (28 goals)
 2013–14 Iranian Futsal Super League
  Ahmad Esmaeilpour (25 goals)
 2016–17 Iranian Futsal Super League
  Mahdi Javid (36 goals)
 2018–19 Iranian Futsal Super League
  Mahdi Javid (37 goals)
 2020–21 Iranian Futsal Super League
  Saeid Ahmadabbasi (26 goals)
 2021–22 Iranian Futsal Super League
  Saeid Ahmadabbasi (41 goals)
 AFC Futsal Club Championship:
 2012 AFC Futsal Club Championship
  Ahmad Esmaeilpour (9 goals)
 Best Manager
 Best Manager of the 2016–17 Iranian Futsal Super League – Reza Lak Aliabadi
 Best Team
 Best Team of the 2016–17 Iranian Futsal Super League

Statistics and records

Statistics in super league

 Seasons in Iranian Futsal Super League: 12
 Best position in Iranian Futsal Super League: First (2012–13, 2016–17, 2021–22)
 Worst position in Iranian Futsal Super League: 3rd (2015–16, 2017–18)
 Most goals scored in a season: 133 (2018–19)
 Most goals scored in a match: 11 - 2, 11 - 4
 Most goals conceded in a match: 5 - 6, 0 - 6
 Top scorer: Saeid Ahmadabbasi with 147 goals

Statistics in AFC Futsal Club Championship
 Most goals scored in a match: 8 – 0 (1 time)
 Most goals conceded in a match: 6 - 3

General statistics
 All-time top scorer: Ahmad Esmaeilpour with 154 goals (All Competitions)
 All-time Most Appearances:
 Player who has won most titles:

Top goalscorers

Players

Current squad

World cup players 

 World Cup 2012
  Mohammad Keshavarz
  Afshin Kazemi
  Hossein Tayyebi
  Ahmad Esmaeilpour
  Sepehr Mohammadi

 World Cup 2016
  Sepehr Mohammadi
  Ahmad Esmaeilpour
  Mohammad Keshavarz
  Ali Asghar Hassanzadeh
  Afshin Kazemi
  Mehran Alighadr
  Mahdi Javid

Notable players

Personnel

Current technical staff

Last updated: November 19, 2021

Managers 

Last updated: 12 March 2022

Club officials

Last updated: November 19, 2021

See also 
 Giti Pasand Football Club

References

External links 
 
 Giti pasand Fan Club website
 Giti Pasand's Stats and History in PersianLeague
 Giti Pasand's Futsal Stats and History in PersianLeague

Futsal clubs in Iran
Sport in Isfahan
2010 establishments in Iran
Futsal clubs established in 2010